The 1997 Pacific Curling Championships were held from December 3 to 7 at the Karuizawa Kazakoshi Park Arena in Karuizawa, Japan. 

Australia won the men's event over Japan (it was the seventh Pacific title for the Australian men). On the women's side, Japan defeated New Zealand in the final (it was the sixth Pacific title for the Japanese women).   

By virtue of winning, the Australian men's team and the Japanese women's team qualified for the 1998 World  and  Curling Championships in Kamloops, British Columbia, Canada.

Men

Teams

Round Robin

 Teams to final

Final

Final standings

Women

Teams

Round Robin

 Teams to final

Final

Final standings

References

General

Specific

Pacific Curling Championships, 1997
Pacific-Asia Curling Championships
International curling competitions hosted by Japan
1997 in Japanese sport
Sport in Nagano Prefecture
December 1997 sports events in Asia
Karuizawa, Nagano